Magnus Sveningsson (born Johan Magnus Sveningsson on 4 April 1972 in Falköping)
is best known as the bassist in the Swedish rock band, The Cardigans, and has also recorded under a solo project entitled Righteous Boy.

In 2006, he restarted The Cardigans' former record label, Trampolene. As an underlabel to Universal  they signed the Swedish band, The Animal Five, who reached some popularity in both Sweden and Germany.

Sveningsson is currently working with different cover bands in Malmö, Sweden.

References

1972 births
Living people
People from Falköping Municipality
Swedish bass guitarists
The Cardigans members
21st-century bass guitarists